Peter William Chiarelli (born March 23, 1950) is a retired United States Army general who served as the 32nd Vice Chief of Staff of the United States Army from August 4, 2008 to January 31, 2012. He also served as commander, Multi-National Corps – Iraq under General George W. Casey, Jr. He was the Senior Military Assistant to the Secretary of Defense from March 2007 to August 2008. He retired from the United States Army on January 31, 2012 after nearly 40 years of service, and was succeeded as Vice Chief of Staff by General Lloyd J. Austin III.

Early life and education
Chiarelli was born in Seattle, Washington, on March 23, 1950, and graduated from Queen Anne High School in 1968. He is a Distinguished Military Graduate of Seattle University Army Reserve Officers' Training Corps. Chiarelli was commissioned a second lieutenant in September 1972. Throughout his career, he has served in army units in the United States, Germany, and Belgium. He has commanded at every level from platoon to corps.

Military career
Chiarelli's first assignments were with the 9th Infantry Division at Fort Lewis, including: support platoon leader for 3rd Squadron (Air), 5th Cavalry Regiment; squadron assistant intelligence staff officer (S-2); squadron intelligence staff officer (S-2); troop executive officer; and troop commander.

Chiarelli's principal staff assignments were Operations Officer (G-3), 1st Cavalry Division, at Fort Hood, Texas; Executive Assistant and, later, Executive Officer to the Supreme Allied Commander, Commander United States European Command at SHAPE Headquarters, Mons, Belgium; and the Director of Operations, Readiness, and Mobilization (G-3/5/7) at Headquarters, Department of the Army.

Chiarelli commanded a motorized infantry battalion, 2nd Battalion, 1st Infantry Regiment, and the 199th Infantry Brigade, a separate motorized brigade at Fort Lewis, Washington; served as the assistant division commander for support in the 1st Cavalry Division at Fort Hood, Texas; served as commanding general, 1st Cavalry Division, and led it both in the Iraq War and during Operation Iraqi Freedom II; and served as commanding general of Multi-National Corps – Iraq from January 2006.

Chiarelli holds a Bachelor of Science degree in political science from Seattle University, a Master of Public Administration degree from the Daniel J. Evans School of Public Affairs at the University of Washington, and a Master of Arts degree in national security strategy from Salve Regina University. He is also a graduate of the U.S. Naval Command and Staff College and the National War College.

Chiarelli worked to reduce suicide rates in the army. Out of concerns for stigma, he began using the term "posttraumatic stress", dropping the word "disorder" from the medical name posttraumatic stress disorder. His term had subsequently become standard use in the armed forces, but was not taken up by the medical community. The name "posttraumatic stress injury" has been proposed by some psychiatrists in 2012, and is endorsed by Chiarelli.

Chiarelli is currently CEO of One Mind, which is dedicated to benefiting all affected by brain illness and injury through fostering fundamental changes – using open science principles and creating global public-private partnerships among governmental, corporate, scientific and philanthropic communities – that will radically accelerate the development and implementation of improved diagnostics, treatments and cures – while eliminating the stigma that comes with mental illness.

Awards and decorations

The Hero of Military Medicine Award was presented May 4, 2011, to Army Vice Chief of Staff Gen. Peter W. Chiarelli for his efforts to help Soldiers with traumatic brain injury and post-traumatic stress. The Henry M. Jackson Foundation for the Advancement of Military Medicine (HJF) presented the award at the National Museum of Women in the Arts in Washington, D.C., during a HJF Center for Public-Private Partnerships  (CP3) event.

References

External links
This article contains information from the United States Army and is in the public domain.
General Peter W. Chiarelli Vice Chief of Staff United States Army
Biography at Carnegie council

Further reading

 Fred Kaplan, "The Insurgents: David Petraeus and the Plot to Change the American Way of War," Simon & Schuster, 2013

External links

Vice Chief of Staff at the United States Army

Interview at PBS Frontline, March 5, 2010

1950 births
Living people
Seattle University alumni
Military personnel from Seattle
Evans School of Public Policy and Governance alumni
Salve Regina University alumni
United States Army personnel of the Iraq War
National War College alumni
Recipients of the Defense Superior Service Medal
Recipients of the Legion of Merit
United States Army generals
Recipients of the Distinguished Service Medal (US Army)
Recipients of the Defense Distinguished Service Medal
United States Army Vice Chiefs of Staff
Post-traumatic stress disorder